The San Joaquin Campo Santo is a Catholic cemetery situated in the town of San Joaquin in Iloilo, Philippines. It is a designated as a National Cultural Treasure by the National Museum of the Philippines together with San Joaquin Church.

The cemetery is under the jurisdiction of the Archdiocese of Jaro.

History
In 1892, the cemetery was established by Augustinian priest, Mariano Vamba. It was declared a National Cultural Treasure in December 2015 by the National Museum of the Philippines and a marker to indicate this designation was installed at the site in August 2016. The park along with the San Joaquin Church, are known as the "San Joaquin Church Complex and Campo Santo of San Joaquin, Iloilo".

The Department of Public Works and Highways plans of a road widening project which would affect a portion of the cemetery's perimeter received nationwide attention in May 2015 but no part of the cemetery's walls was demolished following an appeal by local officials to the transportation department.

A  pit was dug inside the structure of the cemetery's Spanish Baroque mortuary chapel by treasure hunters compromising the integrity of the structure. The digging of the pit reportedly had the authorization of the parish priest of San Joaquin and was commenced as early as December 2015. The parish priest who took a leave of absence was replaced by the Jaro Archdiocese.

A restoration effort was finished by November 2016 which saw the filling of the pit of a proper mixture of soil, rocks and cement initiated by the Archdiocese of Jaro through the assigned Parish Administrator delegated by the Archbishop.

References

External links 
 
 

National Cultural Treasures of the Philippines
Cemeteries in the Philippines
Spanish Colonial architecture in the Philippines
Landmarks in the Philippines
Buildings and structures in Iloilo